S. flavescens may refer to:

 Salix flavescens, a willow native to western North America
 Scarus flavescens, a parrotfish native to the Atlantic Ocean
 Sesamia flavescens, an owlet moth
 Setophaga flavescens, a bird endemic to the Bahamas
 Silaus flavescens, a perennial plant
 Silene flavescens, a flowering plant
 Sitona flavescens, a broad-nosed weevil
 Solmaris flavescens, a jellyfish with a dome-shaped bell
 Sophora flavescens, a plant used in traditional Chinese medicine
 Staphylinus flavescens, a rove beetle
 Stathmopoda flavescens, a concealer moth
 Stenaroa flavescens, an owlet moth
 Stenospermation flavescens, a flowering plant
 Stigmella flavescens, a Turkmen moth
 Streptostyla flavescens, a land snail
 Styposis flavescens, a New World spider
 Syngnathus flavescens, a seaweed pipefish